José Eligio Ayala (December 4, 1879 – October 24, 1930) was President of Paraguay from 12 April 1923 to 17 March 1924 and again from 15 August 1924 until 15 August 1928. He was a member of the Liberal Party.

Jose Eligio Ayala was born in Mbuyapey in the department of Paraguarí on 4 December 1879, son of Spanish Mariano Sisa and Paraguayan Manuela de Jesus Ayala. He was twin brother of Emilio de Jesus Ayala and brother of Eliseo's father, Juan Pablo, Juan Bautista and Manuel Sisa. He was the father of the son of Rosaura Abelardo Gonzalez and daughter Anastasia Candelaria Duplán.

His Life 

The Ayala family owned a farm with some dairy products, a pair of horses, hens, pigs, and a small ranch where they grew some vegetables.

His primary studies were conducted in his hometown and continued in Paraguarí. In 1897 he joined the National College of Encarnación, where his uncle Jose del Rosario Ayala, director of that institution, financed his studies because the Ayala family had limited economic resources. Culminating the third year, he moved to Asuncion to enter the National College Asuncion, where he finished high school, helped by a grant from the government.

After completing the baccalaureate, he obtained a position as a classifier of official documents in the National Archives and joined the Faculty of Law and Social Sciences. There, he was president of the Students’ Council of this house of studies in 1903. He earned his doctorate degree in law and Social Science 22 December 1905. While he was a student, he was taught mathematics and story in secondary schools.

In 1911 he left from the port of Buenos Aires (his place of exile) to Europe to continue his studies in philosophy economics aesthetics and philosophy law at the University of Heidelberg, Germany and Zurich Switzerland. In Berlin he wrote his book "Agricultural Evolution in England" and "The Paraguay seen from Europe." At the end of March 1920, after visiting Spain, Portugal and  Argentina, he returned to Paraguay.

His Government 
He was Minister of Finance of Paraguay from 1920 to 1921, and from 1921 to 1923.

In 1923, following the resignation of provisional president Eusebio Ayala, in the lawless years of the first half of the '20s, Eligio Ayala, who was appointed by Congress, assumed the provisional presidency of the Republic in April, 1923 initiating the pacification of the country after the revolution in 1921/22 and cleansing of public finances. On 3 February 1924, the Convention appointed him as Liberal candidate for the presidency of the Republic and to accompany him as vice president, he appointed Manuel Burgos, that would be the pair for elections that year.

On March 17, 1924, Ayala resigned from the provisional chairmanship noting: "I am grateful to V. Honorably the confidence to play a position of such serious responsibilities. I declare before V. Honorably that I have done so as not to defraud, in the midst of many and powerful contrarieties. “As a new Congress president he appointed doctor Luis. A. Riart.

Eligio Ayala was a candidate in presidential elections, and as he did not have any opposition  in the election, he assumed presidency of Republic of Paraguay, on August 15, 1924.

During his second government, the country experienced the best increase of work, production, export and a substantial improvement in the economic and financial situation in the history of the country. They approved an agreement with the bondholders of loans from 1871–72,the autonomy to the National University was given; the Faculty of Physics and Mathematics was created; treaties were signed Diaz-Leon Gutierrez, with Bolivia, and Ibarra-Mangabeira, with Brazil, supplementary to the treaty of 1872. The archdiocese of the Asuncion was created. They settled in Sajonia the Dockyards War and Navy; created the School of Aspiring Reserve Officers; created a School of Agriculture, and before the impending conflict in Chaco the gunboats "Humaitá" and "Paraguay" were acquired, armaments, etc.. When assuming his successor, José P. Guggiari, From 1928 to 1930, Eligio Ayala resumed as Minister of Finance of Paraguay. He was also author of some 14 books on various topics.

Works during his government 

He adopted a Law on Establishment, Development and Conservation of small agricultural property.
He enacted a law on Accidents at work, in addition to other related to Pensions and Retirement.
Between 1924 and 1926 a considerable number of machines as plows, tractors, cultivators, seeders, etc. were brought.
The financial representative in London signed an agreement with bondholders on borrowings made by Paraguay from 1871.

Political Biography 

He served aa the first judge in the Civil administration of justice. Previously he had served as prosecutor of crime and in 1907, began his political career to run for deputy, and was elected the following year. He became member of the parliament  from the Liberal Party in 1908. He was elected President of the Chamber of Deputies on April 22, 1910. But  political events later forced him to self exile to Argentina.

Eligio Ayala was deadly wounded in a crime of passion on 23 October 1930 and died on 24 October 1930.

References 

 Biographical Dictionary "Forgers OF PARAGUAY," First Edicción January 2000. Distributed editions of Quevedo. Buenos Aires, Argentina.
Whigham, Thomas L. "Eligio Ayala" in Encyclopedia of Latin American History and Culture, vol. 1, p. 246. New York: Charles Scribner's Sons 1996.

External links 
 Presidency of the Republic of Paraguay 

1879 births
1930 deaths
People from Paraguarí Department
Paraguayan people of Basque descent
Liberal Party (Paraguay) politicians
Presidents of Paraguay
Finance Ministers of Paraguay
Presidents of the Chamber of Deputies of Paraguay
Universidad Nacional de Asunción alumni
University of Zurich alumni
Heidelberg University alumni
Paraguayan expatriates in Argentina
Paraguayan expatriates in Germany
Paraguayan expatriates in Switzerland
Paraguayan twins
Deaths by firearm in Paraguay